The Canon EOS 300D, manufactured by Canon, was marketed in North America as the EOS Digital Rebel, in Japan as the EOS Kiss Digital, and was also sold as the DS6041.  It is a 6.3-megapixel entry-level digital single-lens reflex camera.  It was initially announced on 20 August 2003 at a price point of $899 without lens, $999 with the "kit" lens.  It is part of the Canon EOS line of cameras. This was a significant milestone in digital cameras, as it was the first digital SLR offered under $1000.

The 300D was one of the first digital SLR (single lens reflex) cameras that cost less than 1000 euros (£830 at January 2012 exchange rates).

Features
The 300D is often compared to the prosumer Canon EOS 10D, which features virtually the same CMOS image sensor and image processing chip. Several 10D features can be unlocked and used in the 300D by using non-official firmware.

The 300D polycarbonate bodies were originally available in North America in silver color only, whereas the Japanese version was also available in black. Later, black versions of the 300D were also released in the US and Europe.

The 300D was the first camera to use the Canon EF-S lens mount. It also takes the EF lens mount lenses. Canon introduced the EF-S 18–55mm as the kit lens alongside the 300D. It was available in a USM version in Japan and as a non-USM version elsewhere. Very late production black 300D cameras were available with the USM version in Europe.

References

External links
Official Canon specs
Specs by dpreview.com

Cameras introduced in 2003
300D